Speleomaster is a genus of armoured harvestmen in the family Cryptomastridae. There are at least two described species in Speleomaster, both found in lava tubes of the Snake River Plain in southern Idaho.

Species
These two species belong to the genus Speleomaster:
 Speleomaster lexi Briggs, 1974
 Speleomaster pecki Briggs, 1974

References

Further reading

 
 
 
 

Harvestmen